Barrow Hill is a village in Derbyshire, England, north-east of Chesterfield in the civil parish of Staveley. It was formerly the site of Barrow Hill railway station, and now Barrow Hill Engine Shed. 

It is the local authority ward of Barrow Hill and New Whittington, which in 2011 had a population of 5,903.

References

Villages in Derbyshire
Chesterfield, Derbyshire